Adolphe Alésina Sr. (born in 21 April 1943) is a French former rugby league player. He mostly played as lock forward.

His preferred position was lock forward, although he could play at every position. The sports caption indicates that he had played for more than 40 years.

He is the father of Adolphe Alésina.

Rugby league career

Club 

 AS Carcassonne

France national team 

 International (9 caps) 1967-1971, against :
 Great Britain: 1967, 1968, 1971
 Australia: 1967, 1968
 New Zealand: 1968, 1971

References

External links 
Adolphe Alesina - Career Stats & Summary - Rugby  League Project] rugbyleagueproject.com

1943 births
Living people
AS Carcassonne players
France national rugby league team players
French rugby league players
Rugby league locks